Perignano is a village in Tuscany, central Italy, administratively a frazione of the comune of Casciana Terme Lari, province of Pisa. At the time of the 2001 census its population was 2,404.

Perignano is about 30 km from Pisa and 5 km from Lari.

References 

Frazioni of the Province of Pisa